may refer to the following mountains in Japan.

Mount Ōmuro (Mount Fuji), mountain at the foot of Mount Fuji
Mount Ōmuro (Shizuoka), mountain in Izu-Tobu
Mount Ōmuro (Tanzawa), mountain in the Tanzawa Mountains